Hōraku-ji (法楽寺) is a Buddhist temple in Higashisumiyoshi-ku, Osaka, Japan. It was founded in 1178 by Taira no Shigemori.

See also 
Thirteen Buddhist Sites of Osaka

External links 
Official website

Buddhist temples in Osaka
Higashisumiyoshi-ku, Osaka
En no Gyōja
12th-century Buddhist temples
1170s establishments in Japan